Mallika Yunis is an Indian writer who writes novels in Malayalam language. She is probably best known for her 1981 novel Upasana which won her the Maman Mappila literary award in 1982. The novel was made into a critically acclaimed film, titled Ente Upasana, by noted director Bharathan. The 2012 film Karpoora Deepam is also based on her novel. The film, which commenced production in 1998 was in a development hell for 14 years.

Bibliography

Novels
 Upasana
 Varshameghangale Kaathirunnavar
 Nizhalchithrangal
 Vayalppoovu
 Anupallavi
 Nirabhedangal
 Ninakkai Mathram
 Pooppanthal
 Bhadrachitta
 Swapnangale Vida
 Idanaazhiyude Avasaanam
 Akale Neelaakasham
 Vazhithaarakal
 Nirabhedangal
 Swapnakku Sugamaanu
 Randamathoraal
 Sooryakireedom
 Safar
 Karpoora Deepam
 Samarpanam

References

Malayali people
Indian Muslims
Novelists from Kerala
Malayalam-language writers
Malayalam novelists
Living people
Indian women novelists
20th-century Indian women writers
20th-century Indian novelists
Year of birth missing (living people)